Ellis W. Bentley (February 17, 1884 – May 9, 1974) was an American farmer and politician from New York.

Life 
Bentley was born on February 17, 1884, in Brooklyn, New York, the son of John Bentley and Lizzy Annin.

In 1903, Bentley moved to Windham, in the northern Catskills. There, he conducted the largest poultry farm and hatchery in the county. He was involved in various agricultural activities and local organizations. He served on the board of education and was justice of the peace and town supervisor.

In 1922, Bentley was elected to the New York State Assembly as a Republican, representing Greene County. He served in the Assembly in 1923, 1924, 1925, 1926, 1927, 1928, 1929, 1930, 1931, 1932, 1933, and 1934.

Bentley was a member of the Windham Community United Methodist Church. His children were John, Elizabeth, Margie, and Lois.

Bentley died in Falls Church, Virginia, on May 9, 1974. He was buried in the Windham Cemetery.

References

External links 

 The Political Graveyard
 Ellis W. Bentley at Find a Grave

1884 births
1974 deaths
Politicians from Brooklyn
People from Greene County, New York
Farmers from New York (state)
School board members in New York (state)
American justices of the peace
Town supervisors in New York (state)
20th-century American politicians
Republican Party members of the New York State Assembly
American United Methodists
Burials in New York (state)